Joel Lehtinen (born November 16, 1991) is a Finnish ice hockey player. He is currently playing with HIFK in the Finnish Liiga.

Lehtinen made his Liiga debut playing with HIFK during the 2013–14 Liiga season.

References

External links

1991 births
Living people
Finnish ice hockey forwards
HC Keski-Uusimaa players
HIFK (ice hockey) players
Ice hockey people from Helsinki
Kiekko-Vantaa players
Mikkelin Jukurit players